The 1872 East Gloucestershire by-election was fought on 11 March 1872.  The byelection was fought due to the Resignation of the incumbent MP of the Conservative Party, Robert Stayner Holford.  It was won by the Conservative candidate John Reginald Yorke, who was unopposed.

References

East Gloucestershire by-election
East Gloucestershire by-election
East Gloucestershire by-election
By-elections to the Parliament of the United Kingdom in Gloucestershire constituencies
19th century in Gloucestershire
Unopposed by-elections to the Parliament of the United Kingdom in English constituencies